Mike Gorodinsky (born 1986 in St. Petersburg, Russia) is a Russian professional poker player from San Diego, California. He graduated from Olin Business School at the Washington University in St. Louis in 2009. He has two World Series of Poker bracelets in his career. He won his first bracelet in 2013 with the $2,500 Omaha/Seven Card Stud Hi-Low event and the second one came in 2015 when he won the $50,000 Poker Players Championship.

As of 2016, his total live tournament winnings exceed $2,800,000.

World Series of Poker bracelets

References

1986 births
World Series of Poker bracelet winners
WSOP Player of the Year Award winners
Russian poker players
American poker players
Russian emigrants to the United States
People from San Diego
Olin Business School (Washington University) alumni
Living people